"No Can Do" is a 2008 song by British girl group Sugababes.

No Can Do may also refer to:

 "No Can Do", a 1945 song by Charles Tobias and Nat Simon
 No Can Do, a 2012 album by Ladyhawk
 "No Can Do", a song by rapper Keak da Sneak from his 2005 album Contact Sport
 "No Can Do", a song by the O'Jays from their 1993 album Heartbreaker
 "No Can Do", a song by Mark Knopfler from his 1996 album Golden Heart
 "No Can Do", a song by the Nightingales from their 1986 album In the Good Old Country Way

See also
 "I Can't Go for That (No Can Do)",  a 1981 song by the American duo Hall and Oates